Emeric Imre (born 30 January 1965) is a Romanian guitarist, musician, vocalist and composer.

Biography 

Emeric Imre was born in 1965 in Cluj in the housing district Dâmbul Rotund. His mother was half Romanian Romani half Polish and his father was a Hungarian Jew.

Family 
During his childhood he was urged by his father to turn into a musician and he began to study violin. As a young boy he was a football lover and practiced football for nine years. Emeric went often to training with the violin under his arm. Then disaster came... after two years of music, he ended with giving up his musical studies. Leaving the sports career is one of his sorrows.

Musical career 
In 1984 he became part of the folk stage of Cenaclul Flacăra as folk singer until 2000 when Cenaclul Flacăra was disbanded.
After this Emeric Imre fought to promote folk music. Besides participating in events such as the yearly tournament Folk You, he organized folk evenings in Pub Zone located in Cluj-Napoca with the some of the main Romanian folk singers such as Dinu Olărașu, Adrian Ivanițchi, Tatiana Stepa, Florin Chilian, Vali Moldovan, Octavian Bud, Emilian Onciu, and Magda Puskas.
Beginning with 2006 he pushed more for his solo career, his own shows and begun to release records.
In 2006 he prints the album Nebun de alb ( English translation White Bishop).
In 2012 he prints the album Târziu ( English translation Late).
In 2014 he launches his winter album named Iarna mea cu ochii mari ( English translation My Winter With Big Eyes). At this album contributed among others Jimi El Laco (Nightlosers), Dorel Vișan, Dumitru Fărcaș, Cornel Udrea, Hollondus J.Zoltanau, Magda Puskas.
In 2018 he releases his forth album named Jocul vieții ( English translation The game of life).

Awards 

During his career, Emeric Imre he received the following awards:

Was nominalised for the prize awarded by Radio România:
 "Best folk album" of the year 2012 for the album Târziu. 
 "Best folk singer" of the year 2012 
 "Best song" of the year 2012 with the song Cântec de final.

Main musical creations 

Emeric composed over 260 folk songs. Among those the most important are:
 Nebun de alb aka. White Bishop lyrics by  Adrian Păunescu (2006)
 Bună varianta rea lyrics by Adrian Păunescu
 Orație de nuntă lyrics by Adrian Păunescu
 Noapte de unul singur lyrics by Adrian Păunescu
 Juramânt lyrics by Adrian Păunescu
 Condamnarea la toamnă lyrics by Adrian Păunescu
 Cântec pentru Aurora lyrics by Emeric Imre
 Respirarea aerului de sub aripă pe lyrics by Nichita Stănescu
 Sinuciderea lui Don Juan lyrics by de Ion Minulescu
 Scrisoare suparată lyrics by Viorel Garbaciu
 Cântec de final lyrics by Dorin Tudoran
 Povestea cavalerului cu brici lyrics by Emil Brumaru

Discography
 Nebun de alb (2006)
 Târziu (2012)
 Iarna mea cu ochii mari (2014)
 Jocul vieții (2018)

Filmography 
 După un an

Bibliography 
  Today is your birthday: Emeric Imre by Luminița Ciobanu, published in Jurnalul, 30 January 2015
   Emeric Imre – The regrets and cheers (Bucuriile și tristețile lui)  published in Ziar de Cluj, written by Florin Moldovan, 31 July 2015
   Maximum Folk: An evening of song and poetry in Timișoara (Folk la maxim: seară de muzică și poezie cu Emeric Imre, la)  published in Pressalert by Zoltan Varga, 5 February 2014 
  Interviu Emeric Imre – TV show "Altfel" TV channel Antena 1, produced by Dana Turcu, 11 June 2013
  Emeric Imre, "the White Bishop" on a colorful canvas ("nebun de alb" pe o tablă multicoloră) at Radio Cluj, host Florin Săsărman, 29 October 2015

References

External links 
 Emeric Imre Official
  Emeric Imre YouTube channel
 Emeric Imre Official page on Facebook

1965 births
Living people
Musicians from Cluj-Napoca
Romanian folk singers
Romani musicians
Romani guitarists
Romani singers
Romanian Jews
Romanian people of Hungarian descent
Romanian people of Polish descent